Lopukhin (from лопух meaning burdock) is a Russian masculine surname, its feminine counterpart is Lopukhina. It may refer to
nobles from the Lopukhin family
Aleksandr Lopukhin (1852–1904), Russian Bible commentator

See also
Lopukhov